Lorenza Julia Álvarez Resano (1903–1948) was a Spanish lawyer, teacher and politician. A member of the Spanish Socialist Workers' Party, she was a member of the Congress of Deputies of the Second Spanish Republic from 1936 to 1939. She was the first woman ever to assume the office of civil governor in Spain.

Biography 
Born on 10 August 1903 in Villafranca, Navarre. She earned a title in educational practice in the provincial capital Pamplona, later passing a public examination to the post of school teacher in 1923 in Zaragoza. Initially close to the Radical Socialist Republican Party, she later joined the Spanish Socialist Workers' Party (PSOE). She obtained a licentiate degree in Law at the University of Zaragoza in 1933.

She married , also a lawyer and PSOE politician, in 1935.

After unsuccessfully running as PSOE candidate at the 1933 election, she was elected as member of the Republican Cortes in the constituency of Madrid–province at the 1936 election. In addition, she served as civil governor of the province of Ciudad Real during wartime (1937–1938).
 
Adherent to the negrinista faction of the PSOE, fallen from grace after the end of the Civil War, she was expelled from the party in 1946 along Negrín and other followers. She was to be symbolically reinstated as member of the PSOE in 2009.

Ultimately exiled to Mexico in 1947, she died in Mexico City on 19 May 1948.

References 
Citations

Bibliography

 
 
 

Members of the Congress of Deputies of the Second Spanish Republic
Civil governors of Spanish provinces
1903 births
1948 deaths
University of Zaragoza alumni
Spanish Socialist Workers' Party politicians
Spanish women lawyers
Exiles of the Spanish Civil War in France
Exiles of the Spanish Civil War in Mexico
20th-century Spanish lawyers
20th-century Spanish women politicians
Exiled Spanish politicians
20th-century women lawyers